Hryhoriy Ivanovych Batych (Hryhoriy Ivanovych Batych; 8 February 1958 – 24 November 2008) was a Ukrainian football midfielder and coach.

He capped for USSR youth team at 1977 FIFA World Youth Championship.

Hryhoriy Batych was born in a family of a deported Ukrainian Insurgent Army militant Ivan Batih whose name during deportation was butchered by a NKVD officials to Batich (adopted to Ukrainian as Batych). So it was left as such afterwards when the family returned to Lviv in 1972.

Honours
Karpaty Lviv
Soviet First League: 1979
Soviet Union youth
FIFA World Youth Championship: 1977

References

External links
 

1958 births
2008 deaths
Sportspeople from Karaganda
Kazakhstani people of Ukrainian descent
Soviet footballers
Soviet Union youth international footballers
Soviet Top League players
FC Karpaty Lviv players
FC Zimbru Chișinău players
FC SKA-Karpaty Lviv players
FC Bukovyna Chernivtsi players
FC Hoverla Uzhhorod players
FC Avanhard Zhydachiv players
CSF Bălți players
Association football forwards